The Very Best of Travis Tritt is the title of a compilation album released in 2007 by American country music singer Travis Tritt. It features 19 hits from his first several studio albums, as well as his rendition of the Eagles hit "Take It Easy", which he recorded in 1993 for Common Thread: The Songs of the Eagles. The album itself reached #21 on the Billboard Top Country Albums charts.

Track listing

Critical reception

The Very Best of Travis Tritt received four-and-a-half stars from Jason Birchmeier of Allmusic. Birchmeier's review states that "it's difficult to envision a better-compiled Warner Brothers-era single-disc collection of Tritt's music." Jolene Downs of About.com gave the album five stars and says that the album "showcases Tritt's incredible talents not only as a songwriter but as a very versatile vocalist."

Chart performance
The Very Best of Travis Tritt peaked at number 21 on the U.S. Billboard Top Country Albums chart and number 124 on the Billboard 200. As of April 2015, The Very Best of Travis Tritt has sold 506,100 copies in the United States.

References

Travis Tritt albums
Rhino Records compilation albums
2007 greatest hits albums